As Good as It Gets is a 1997 American romantic comedy-drama film directed by James L. Brooks, who co-wrote it with Mark Andrus. The film stars Jack Nicholson as a misanthropic, bigoted, and obsessive–compulsive novelist, Helen Hunt as a single mother with a chronically ill son, and Greg Kinnear as an artist who is gay. The film premiered in Regency Village Theatre on December 6, 1997, and was released in theaters on December 25, 1997, and was a critical and box office hit, grossing $314.1 million on a $50 million budget.

Nicholson and Hunt won the Academy Award for Best Actor and Best Actress, respectively, making As Good as It Gets the most recent film to win both of the lead acting awards, and the first since 1991's The Silence of the Lambs. It was also nominated for Best Picture but ultimately lost to Titanic. It is ranked 140th on Empire magazine's "The 500 Greatest Movies of All Time" list.

Plot
Misanthropic New York City best-selling romance novelist Melvin Udall has obsessive–compulsive disorder; he uses soap bars to wash his hands only once, dislikes touching pets, avoids stepping on sidewalk cracks while walking through the city, and eats his breakfast at the same table in the same restaurant. He takes an interest in his waitress, Carol Connelly, the only server at the restaurant who can tolerate his uncouth behavior.

One day, Melvin's apartment neighbor, gay artist Simon Bishop, is assaulted and nearly killed during a robbery. Simon's agent, Frank Sachs, intimidates Melvin into caring for Simon's Griffon Bruxellois, Verdell, while he is hospitalized. Although he initially does not enjoy caring for the dog, Melvin becomes emotionally attached to it, simultaneously receiving more attention from Carol. When Simon is released from the hospital, Melvin is unable to cope emotionally with returning the dog. Melvin's life is further altered when Carol decides to work closer to her home in Brooklyn so she can care for her acutely asthmatic son Spencer. Unable to adjust to a different waitress, Melvin arranges through his publisher (whose husband is a doctor) to pay for her son's considerable medical expenses as long as Carol agrees to return to work. She is overwhelmed but doubts his generosity.

Meanwhile, Simon's assault and rehabilitation, coupled with Verdell's preference for Melvin, causes Simon to lose his creative muse and fall into a depression. With no medical insurance, he is approaching bankruptcy due to his medical bills. Frank persuades him to go to Baltimore to ask his estranged parents for money. Because Frank is too busy to take the injured Simon to Baltimore himself, Melvin reluctantly agrees to do so; Frank lends Melvin the use of his Saab 900 convertible for the trip. Melvin invites Carol to accompany them on the trip to lessen the awkwardness. She reluctantly accepts, and relationships among the three develop.

Once in Baltimore, Carol persuades Melvin to take her out for dinner. Melvin's comments during the dinner greatly flatter—and subsequently upset—Carol, and she abruptly leaves. Upon seeing her, frustrated, Simon begins to sketch her, semi-nude, in his hotel room, which rekindles his creativity, and he once more feels a desire to paint. He briefly reconnects with his mother, but is able to tell her that he will be fine.

After returning to New York, Carol tells Melvin that she does not want him in her life anymore, but later regrets her statement and calls to apologize. The relationship between Melvin and Carol remains complicated, until Simon (whom Melvin has allowed to move in with him, as his apartment has been sublet) persuades Melvin to declare his love for her. Melvin goes to see Carol, who hesitantly agrees to try and establish a relationship with him. The film ends with Melvin and Carol walking together. As he opens the door at an early morning pastry shop for Carol, he realizes that he has stepped on a crack in the pavement, but does not seem to mind.

Cast

 Jack Nicholson as Melvin Udall
 Helen Hunt as Carol Connelly
 Greg Kinnear as Simon Bishop
 Cuba Gooding Jr. as Frank Sachs
 Skeet Ulrich as Vincent Lopiano
 Shirley Knight as Beverly Connelly
 Jesse James as Spencer "Spence" Connelly
 Yeardley Smith as Jackie Simpson
 Lupe Ontiveros as Nora Manning
 Bibi Osterwald as Neighbor Woman
 Harold Ramis as Dr. Martin Bettes
 Lawrence Kasdan as Dr. Green
 Julie Benz as Receptionist
 Shane Black as Brian, Cafe 24 manager
 Leslie Stefanson as Cafe 24 Waitress
 Tom McGowan as Maitre D'
 Brian Doyle-Murray as Handyman
 Jamie Kennedy as Street Hustler
 Missi Pyle as Cafe 24 Waitress
 Wood Harris as Cafe 24 Busboy
 Maya Rudolph as Policewoman
 Todd Solondz as Man on Bus
 Jill as dog Verdell

Production
In 1996, James L. Brooks flew Geoffrey Rush from Sydney to Los Angeles to audition for the part of Simon Bishop, and offered him the role, but Rush declined it. Betty White was offered a role in the film but she declined, due to a scene in the film where a dog is thrown into a trash chute.

Owen Wilson served as associate producer, one of his first jobs in Hollywood.

Nicholson and Brooks clashed on set regarding Nicholson's performance of Melvin, leading to a production halt for the two to find the correct tone for the character.

The paintings were created for the film by New York artist Billy Sullivan.

Soundtrack

The soundtrack features instrumental pieces composed by Hans Zimmer and songs by various artists. Zimmer's work was nominated for the Academy Award for Best Original Score – Musical or Comedy.

Release

Box office
As Good as It Gets was a box office hit, opening at number three at the box office (behind Titanic and Tomorrow Never Dies) with $12.6 million, and eventually earning over $148 million domestically and $314 million worldwide. It is Jack Nicholson's second highest earning film, behind Batman.

Critical reception 
Chicago Reader film critic Jonathan Rosenbaum wrote that what director James L. Brooks "manages to do with [the characters] as they struggle mightily to connect with one another is funny, painful, beautiful, and basically truthful—a triumph for everyone involved."

Praise for the film was not uniform among critics. While Roger Ebert gave the film three stars (out of four), he called the film a "compromise, a film that forces a smile onto material that doesn't wear one easily," writing that the film drew "back to story formulas," but had good dialogue and performances. The Washington Post critic Desson Howe gave a generally negative review of the film, writing that it "gets bogged down in sentimentality, while its wheels spin futilely in life-solving overdrive."

Review aggregator Rotten Tomatoes reports that 86% of professional critics gave the film a positive review based on 83 reviews, with an average rating of 7.30/10. The consensus states: "James L. Brooks and Jack Nicholson, doing what they do best, combine smart dialogue and flawless acting to squeeze fresh entertainment value out of the romantic-comedy genre." Metacritic gave the film a score of 67 out of 100, based on reviews from 30 critics, indicating generally favorable reviews.

Accolades

Home media 
The film was released on VHS, LaserDisc and DVD on May 19, 1998. It was released on Blu-ray in the United States on June 12, 2012 as part of Twilight Time's Screen Archives collection. The set was limited to 3,000 units and sold out quickly.

Sony Pictures released the film on 4K UHD Blu-ray on October 25, 2022 as part of its Columbia Classics 4K Ultra HD Collection Volume 3, along with It Happened One Night, From Here To Eternity, To Sir, With Love, The Last Picture Show and Annie.

References

External links

 
 
 
 
 
 
 
 As Good as It Gets at The New York Times
 [ As Good as It Gets] soundtrack review at AllMusic

1997 films
1997 LGBT-related films
1997 romantic comedy films
American LGBT-related films
American romantic comedy films
Best Musical or Comedy Picture Golden Globe winners
1990s English-language films
Films scored by Hans Zimmer
Films about obsessive–compulsive disorder
Films about pets
Films about writers
Films directed by James L. Brooks
Films featuring a Best Actor Academy Award-winning performance
Films featuring a Best Actress Academy Award-winning performance
Films featuring a Best Musical or Comedy Actor Golden Globe winning performance
Films featuring a Best Musical or Comedy Actress Golden Globe winning performance
Films produced by James L. Brooks
Films set in Baltimore
Films set in New York City
Films shot in New York City
Films with screenplays by James L. Brooks
Gay-related films
Gracie Films films
TriStar Pictures films
Films about mother–son relationships
1990s American films